Dhananjay N. Jadhav (1947 – 30 March 2021) was a Police Commissioner of Mumbai.

References

1947 births
2021 deaths
Police Commissioners of Mumbai
People from Satara (city)